Ormet may refer to:

 Örmt, Norse mythology
 Ormet Corporation, American aluminium smelter